Sankt Georgen may refer to several places, all named after the German name of Saint George:

In Austria 
in Carinthia:
Sankt Georgen am Längsee in the district St. Veit an der Glan 
Stift Sankt Georgen abbey near Sankt Georgen am Längsee
Sankt Georgen im Lavanttal in the district Wolfsberg 
in Lower Austria:
Sankt Georgen am Reith in the district Amstetten 
Sankt Georgen am Ybbsfelde in the district Amstetten 
Sankt Georgen an der Leys in the district Scheibbs 
in Salzburg:
Sankt Georgen bei Salzburg in the district Salzburg-Umgebung
in Styria:
Sankt Georgen an der Stiefing in the district Leibniz 
Sankt Georgen ob Judenburg in the district Judenburg 
Sankt Georgen ob Murau in the district Murau 
in Upper Austria:
Sankt Georgen am Fillmannsbach in the district Braunau am Inn 
Sankt Georgen am Walde in the district Perg 
Sankt Georgen an der Gusen in the district Perg 
Sankt Georgen bei Grieskirchen in the district Grieskirchen 
Sankt Georgen bei Obernberg am Inn in the district Ried im Innkreis 
Sankt Georgen im Attergau in the district Vöcklabruck 
St. Georgen, a church at Rennweg am Katschberg

In Germany 
Sankt Georgen im Schwarzwald in Schwarzwald-Baar (district), Baden-Württemberg
Sankt Georgen (Bayreuth), a district of Bayreuth 
Sankt Georgen (Freiburg), a district of Freiburg
Sankt Georgen Graduate School of Philosophy and Theology, Frankfurt-am-Main

In Romania 
Sfântu Gheorghe

In Slovakia 
 Svätý Jur (Sankt Georgen)
 Borský Svätý Jur (Bur-Sankt-Georg)

In Slovenia 
 Podkum, a village in the Municipality of Zagorje ob Savi in central Slovenia
 Podšentjur, a village in the Municipality of Litija in central Slovenia
 Šenčur, a village in the Municipality of Šenčur in northern Slovenia
 Sveti Jurij, Rogašovci, a village in the Municipality of Rogašovci in northeastern Slovenia

See also
 St. George